Parque Explora is an interactive science museum in Medellín, Colombia, loosely modeled after San Francisco's Exploratorium. It houses South America's largest freshwater aquarium, Explora Aquarium. The museum contains over 300 interactive attractions, as well as a 3D auditorium, planetarium, television studio, and vivarium. The museum opened in 2008.

Architecture
Architect Alejandro Echeverri designed the museum. It has a combination of indoor and outdoor space. Its four red "cubes" house the museum's science and technology rooms.

Explora Aquarium

Explora aquarium houses nearly 4,000 organisms and 399 of Colombia's most common species. Its 25 tanks exhibit many of the most representative species that inhabit Colombia's rivers and oceans, including piranhas, electric eels, and a panchromatic kaleidoscope of fish.

Location
Parque Explora is located in the northern area of Medellín, known as the North Zone (Zona Norte), between Parque Norte and the Botanical Garden of Medellín. The museum can be reached by the Medellín Metro on line A, at the University Station stop, which is named for the nearby University of Antioquia.

References

External links

 Official website

Museums in Medellín
Aquaria in Colombia
Science museums